Korsh is a rural locality (a selo) in Kalyalskoye Rural Settlement, Rutulsky District, Republic of Dagestan, Russia. The population was 63 as of 2010. There are two streets.

Geography 
Korsh is located 44 km northwest of Rutul (the district's administrative centre) by road. Mishlesh and Ottal are the nearest rural localities.

Nationalities 
Tsakhur people live there.

References 

Rural localities in Rutulsky District